Thokchom Naoba Singh (born 1 March 1988) is an Indian professional footballer who last played as a defender for NEROCA in the I-League.

Career

East Bengal
After spending his youth career with the famed Tata Football Academy, Naoba signed for Churchill Brothers of the I-League. While with Churchill Brothers Singh scored one goal which came against Mahindra United in the I-League on 3 March 2010. Later in 2010 Singh signed for East Bengal who also play in the I-League. Naoba represented Delhi Dynamos FC during the 2014 Indian Super League before signing for I-League newcomers, Royal Wahingdoh for the 2014-15 season. In July 2015 Singh was drafted to play for Delhi Dynamos in the 2015 Indian Super League.

International
Singh made eight appearances for the India U23 team, and played in the 2009 SAFF Cup.

Honours

India U23
SAFF Championship: 2009

References

1988 births
Living people
Indian footballers
Footballers from Manipur
East Bengal Club players
I-League players
Churchill Brothers FC Goa players
Odisha FC players
Royal Wahingdoh FC players
Indian Super League players
Association football defenders
Mumbai FC players
NEROCA FC players
India youth international footballers